Kiran Sridhara Kedlaya (born July 1974) is an Indian American mathematician. He currently is a Professor of Mathematics and the Stefan E. Warschawski Chair in Mathematics at the University of California, San Diego.

Biography
Kiran Kedlaya was born into a Tulu Brahmin family. At age 16, Kedlaya won a gold medal at the International Mathematics Olympiad, and would later win a silver and another gold medal. While an undergraduate student at Harvard, he was a three-time Putnam Fellow in 1993, 1994, and 1995. A 1996 article by The Harvard Crimson described him as "the best college-age student in math in the United States".

Kedlaya was runner-up for the 1995 Morgan Prize, for a paper in which he substantially improved on results of László Babai and Vera Sós (1985) on the size of the largest product-free subset of a finite group of order n.

He gave an invited talk at the International Congress of Mathematicians in 2010, on the topic of "Number Theory".

In 2012 he became a fellow of the American Mathematical Society.

Game shows
He was also a contestant on the game show Jeopardy! in 2011, winning one episode.

Selected works
 p-adic Differential Equations, Cambridge Studies in Advanced Mathematics, Band 125, Cambridge University Press 2010
 with David Savitt, Dinesh Thakur, Matt Baker, Brian Conrad, Samit Dasgupta,  Jeremy Teitelbaum p-adic Geometry, Lectures from the 2007 Arizona Winter School, American Mathematical Society 2008
 with Bjorn Poonen, Ravi Vakil The William Lowell Putnam Mathematical Competition 1985-2000: Problems, Solutions and Commentary, Mathematical Association of America, 2002

References

External links
Kiran Kedlaya's website

1974 births
Living people
Algebraic geometers
Indian number theorists
American people of Indian descent
People from Silver Spring, Maryland
Harvard University alumni
Princeton University alumni
Massachusetts Institute of Technology School of Science alumni
Massachusetts Institute of Technology faculty
University of California, San Diego faculty
Fellows of the American Mathematical Society
International Mathematical Olympiad participants
21st-century Indian mathematicians
Putnam Fellows
Recipients of the Presidential Early Career Award for Scientists and Engineers